Linus Karlsson (born 4 July 1989) is a Swedish male para table tennis player competing at singles (class 8) and team events (class 6–8). Karlsson and Emil Andersson won a silver medal at the 2016 Summer Paralympics in Rio de Janeiro, playing against the Ukrainian team at the men's team class 6-8 finals.

References 

1989 births
Living people
Paralympic table tennis players of Sweden
Swedish male table tennis players
Medalists at the 2016 Summer Paralympics
Paralympic silver medalists for Sweden
Paralympic medalists in table tennis
Table tennis players at the 2016 Summer Paralympics
Table tennis players at the 2020 Summer Paralympics
21st-century Swedish people